The men's C-2 1000 metres event was an open-style, pairs canoeing event conducted as part of the Canoeing at the 1996 Summer Olympics program.

Medalists

Results

Heats
17 teams entered in two heats. The top two finishers from each of the heats advanced directly to the finals and the remaining teams were relegated to the semifinals.

Semifinals
Two semifinals took place. The top two finishers from each semifinal and the fastest third-place finisher advanced directly to the final.

The Antiguan and Barbudan crew did not participate in the semifinal.

Final
The final was held on August 3.

Romania established an early lead, gradually expanding it through the 750 meter mark. Meanwhile, the Germans were in last place after 250 meters before moving up to fourth place at 500 meters. Gathering strength in the third quarter of the race, the Germans launched a sustained sprint to the finish that made up 2.15 seconds on the Romanians in the last 250 meters of the race to pass them right before the finish.

References
1996 Summer Olympics official report Volume 3. pp. 173–4. 
Sports-reference.com 1996 C-2 1000 m results.
Wallechinsky, David and Jaime Loucky (2008). "Canoeing: Men's Canadian Doubles 1000 Meters". In The Complete Book of the Olympics: 2008 Edition. London: Aurum Press Limited. p. 484.

Men's C-2 1000
Men's events at the 1996 Summer Olympics